Euchelus bermudensis is a species of sea snail, a marine gastropod mollusk in the family Chilodontidae.

Description
The height of the shell attains 3.3 mm.

Distribution
This species occurs in the Atlantic Ocean off Bermuda.

References

External links
 To Encyclopedia of Life
 To USNM Invertebrate Zoology Mollusca Collection
 To World Register of Marine Species

bermudensis
Molluscs described in 1989